Miss Meyers (1949 – March 1963) was an American Quarter Horse racehorse and broodmare, the 1953 World Champion Quarter Running Horse. She won $28,725 as well as 17 races. As a broodmare, she produced, or was the mother of, the first American Quarter Horse Association (AQHA) Supreme Champion, Kid Meyers. She was the mother of three other foals, and was inducted into the AQHA Hall of Fame in 2009.

Early life

Miss Meyers was a chestnut-colored mare born in 1949 and sired, or fathered, by Leo, a member of the AQHA Hall of Fame. Miss Meyers' dam, or mother, was Star's Lou. Star's Lou's father was Oklahoma Star P-6, another AQHA Hall of Fame member. She was bred by O. C. Meyer, and later owned by Bruce A. Green.

Race career

Miss Meyers raced from 1952 until 1955 and won seven stakes races, placing second in seven others, and third in two more. She won 17 of her 59 starts on the racetrack. She placed second in another 15 races and third in 5. Her total earnings on the track were $28,727. Among her wins in stakes races were the 1952 Buttons and Bows Stakes, the 1953 California Championship, the 1953 Billy Anson Stakes, the 1953 Rocky Mountain Quarter Horse Association World Championship Dash, the 1955 Bart B Stakes, the 1955 Barbara B Stakes and the 1955 Traveler Stakes. In 1953 she was named the AQHA World Champion Quarter Running Horse, as well as the High Money Earning Horse; the AQHA also awarded her the title of Superior Race Horse in 1954. The highest speed index she achieved, a measure of how fast she was able to run, during her racing career was AAAT, the highest possible at the time. It was not until she was a four-year-old, during 1953, that Miss Meyers performed well and started winning on the track. That year she won $15,398, over half her lifetime earnings, as well as seven of her seventeen career wins.

Broodmare and legacy

After Miss Meyers retired from the racetrack, she became the dam of the first AQHA Supreme Champion, Kid Meyers, sired by fellow Hall of Famer Three Bars, a Thoroughbred. (A Supreme Champion is a horse that is outstanding on the racetrack, as a riding horse at horse shows and also conformationally, or how well put together the horse is). Kid Meyers was a 1963 sorrel stallion, and had 23 starts on the racetrack, winning 6 times. He earned a total of $10,655 on the track. After retiring from the racetrack, he earned his AQHA Champion in 1966 and his AQHA Supreme Champion in 1967. His highest speed index was AAA. Unlike most foals, who nurse for months after birth, Kid Meyers was orphaned at the age of one month in March 1963.

Miss Meyers had three other foals. Oh My Oh, a 1957 bay mare sired by the Thoroughbred stallion Spotted Bull, started 30 times, winning eight races for a total earnings of $12,592 and coming in second in a stakes race. She earned an AAAT speed index. As a broodmare, she was the dam of All American Futurity winner Three Oh's. Miss Meyers' 1958 foal was Mr Meyers, a sorrel stallion sired by fellow Hall of Famer Go Man Go, who started 41 times, winning 9 times and placing third in four stakes races. His total race earnings were $25,656. He went on to earn an AQHA Champion title along with a Superior Race Horse award, to go with his AAAT speed index. Mr Meyers became a successful breeding stallion. Miss Meyers' fourth foal was a 1959 chestnut mare named Milpool sired by Vandy. Milpool was never raced or entered in a horse show.

Miss Meyers died in March 1963, shortly after having Kid Meyers. She was inducted into the AQHA's American Quarter Horse Hall of Fame in 2009.

Pedigree

Notes

Citations

References

 American Quarter Horse Association (AQHA) (1996). AQHA Official Produce of Dam Record for Miss Meyers American Quarter Horse Association Records Department. Retrieved February 20, 1996

External links
 

1949 racehorse births
1963 racehorse deaths
American Quarter Horse broodmares
American Quarter Horse racehorses
AQHA Hall of Fame (horses)